The Eastern College Athletic Conference (ECAC) Bowl was a college football bowl game played from 1989 to 2003. From 1993 until its cancellation in 2003, the game pitted the champion of the Northeast Conference against the Metro Atlantic Athletic Conference champion. All games were played on campus sites.

All games involved a team from either New York State or Pennsylvania, and only the 1997 game, hosted by Georgetown University, did not take place in either one of those states. At the time, the NEC and MAAC were two of three conferences (the third being the Pioneer Football League) that did not have an automatic bid into the NCAA Division I Football Championship but had not voluntarily abstained from the tournament; the conferences were notable in that they did not offer football scholarships. The Northeast Conference edged the MAAC in all-time results, with NEC members winning six of the ten games.

By 2003, several of the MAAC universities were closing down their football teams, and the ECAC Bowl was likewise shuttered; this contraction eventually led to the conference's dropping of the sport in 2007. From 2006-2009, the NEC champion instead participated in the Gridiron Classic against the Pioneer Football League champion. The NEC was awarded an automatic bid to the NCAA tournament in 2010, with the PFL receiving their bid in 2013.

Results

ECAC Bowl Series (Division III) 
The ECAC introduced in 1983 two Division III football bowl games: The Metro NY/NJ and the New England bowls. In 1984 they were renamed to North and South, and in 1991 they were expanded to two games per region: Northeast, Northwest, Southeast and Southwest bowls. In 2002 they were expanded to three games per region, with an additional game per region if there were enough qualifying teams: Northeast, Northwest, North Atlantic, Southeast, Southwest, South Atlantic, North Central (2010, 2013, 2014) and South Central (2008). Format was changed in 2015 so all the teams played at a single site over three days, and names were changed to: Asa S. Bushnell, Clayton Chapman, James Lynah, Legacy, Presidents and Robert M. "Scotty" Whitelaw. The games returned to campus sites in 2018, but with only four played: Asa S. Bushnell, Clayton Chapman, James Lynah and Robert M. "Scotty" Whitelaw. At this point many conferences had decided to sponsor bowls outside the ECAC structure (New England Bowl Series, New York Bowl and Centennial-MAC Bowl Series).

Results

References

External links
ECAC Division III Bowls results 

 
Defunct college football bowls
Eastern College Athletic Conference
Recurring sporting events established in 1989
Recurring events disestablished in 2003
NCAA Division III football